The 2017–18 Montpellier HSC season was the club's 91st season in existence and the club's 16th consecutive season in the top flight of French football. In addition to the domestic league, Montpellier participated in this season's editions of the Coupe de France and the Coupe de la Ligue. The season covered the period from 1 July 2017 to 30 June 2018.

Players

First-team squad
As of 23 January 2018

Out on loan

Transfers

In

Out

Pre-season and friendlies

Competitions

Overview

Ligue 1

League table

Results summary

Results by round

Matches
The league fixtures were announced on 15 June 2017.

Coupe de France

Coupe de la Ligue

Statistics

Goalscorers

References

External links

Montpellier HSC seasons
Montpellier